Hermitage is a village near Newcastleton, on the B6399, in the Scottish Borders area of Scotland.

See also
List of places in the Scottish Borders
List of places in Scotland

External links
RCAHMS: Hermitage, The Buck Stone
http://www.geograph.org.uk/photo/320847

Villages in the Scottish Borders